= Roughing filter =

Water filter

Roughing filters provide pretreatment for turbid water or simple, low maintenance treatment when high water quality is not needed.
